The Ministry of Telecommunications and Technology of the Republic of Somaliland (MoTRD)  is a member of the Somaliland cabinet which is responsible for formulating developmental policies aimed at accelerating growth of telecommunication and technology services in the country.
The current minister is Abdiweli Sheikh Abdillahi.

Ministers of Telecommunications

See also
 Politics of Somaliland
 Cabinet of Somaliland

References

External links
Official Site of the Government of Somaliland

Politics of Somaliland
Government ministries of Somaliland